Dejoannisia is a genus of moths of the family Crambidae. It contains only one species, Dejoannisia pallidella, which is found in Mozambique.

References

Endemic fauna of Mozambique
Schoenobiinae
Lepidoptera of Mozambique
Moths of Sub-Saharan Africa
Crambidae genera
Monotypic moth genera